This is the discography of  English rock band James.

Albums

Studio albums

1Released as James in the US in 1991

Compilation albums

Live albums

Extended plays

Singles

Notes

Promotional singles

Videography

Video albums

Music videos

References

Discographies of British artists
Rock music group discographies
Discography